The Forbidden Kingdom (: Gong Fu Zhi Wang (Mandarin) or Gung Fu Ji Wong (Cantonese) and translated King of Kung Fu (English); Working title: The J & J Project) is a 2008 wuxia film written by John Fusco, and directed by Rob Minkoff, and starring Jackie Chan and Jet Li. Loosely based on the 16th-century novel Journey to the West, it is the first film to star Jackie Chan and Jet Li. The action sequences were choreographed by Yuen Woo-ping.

The film is distributed in the United States through Lionsgate and The Weinstein Company, and through The Huayi Brothers Film & Taihe Investment Company in China. It was released on DVD and Blu-ray in the US and Hong Kong on September 9, 2008 and the United Kingdom on November 17, 2008. Rotten Tomatoes' critical consensus praises the fight scenes but says the film has too much filler. The Forbidden Kingdom grossed $128 million against a budget of $55 million. The film was a box office success.

Plot
South Boston teenager Jason Tripitikas is a fan of martial arts films. He dreams of a battle between Sun Wukong and celestial soldiers in the clouds. He visits a pawn shop in Chinatown to buy wuxia DVDs and discovers a golden staff. On his way home, Jason is harassed by some hooligans, whose leader Lupo attempts to use him to help them rob the shop-owner Hop, who is shot by Lupo. Hop tells Jason to deliver the staff to its rightful owner and Jason flees with the staff. He is cornered on the rooftop before being pulled off the roof by the staff.

When Jason regains consciousness, he finds himself in a village in ancient China  under attack by soldiers. The soldiers attempt to seize his staff. He is saved by the inebriated traveling scholar Lu Yan, a supposed "immortal," who remains alert and agile even when drunk. Lu tells him the story of the rivalry between the Monkey King and the Jade Warlord. The Warlord tricked the King into setting aside his magic staff, Ruyi Jingu Bang, and transformed the immortal into a stone statue, but the King cast his staff far away before the transformation. Lu ends the tale with a prophecy about a "Seeker" who will find the staff and free the King. Just then, they are attacked by the Warlord's men again, but manage to escape with the help of Golden Sparrow, a young woman whose family was murdered by the Warlord.

Meanwhile, the Warlord, upon learning about the staff, sends the witch Ni-Chang to help him retrieve it in exchange for the elixir of immortality. Jason, Lu and Sparrow meet the Silent Monk who joins them in their quest to free the King. As the four travel to Five Elements Mountain, Lu and the Monk teach Jason kung fu along the way. After crossing a desert, they encounter Ni Chang. Ni Chang offers to return Jason home in exchange for the staff. When Jason refuses, a battle ensues. Ni Chang shoots an arrow which mortally wounds Lu. Jason's team escapes and takes refuge in a monastery, where they learn that Lu is not an immortal as he claimed to be, and only the Warlord's elixir can save his life. Jason goes to the Warlord's palace alone to exchange the staff for the elixir.

Because the Warlord can only give the elixir to one of them, he orders Jason to duel Ni Chang - the winner will receive the elixir. Sparrow, the Silent Monk, and the monks from the monastery arrive to join the battle. Silent Monk fights the Warlord. Sparrow fights the witch. While the witch is distracted, Jason manages to grab the elixir and tosses it to Lu, who drinks it and recovers. Lu then fights Ni Chang on the balcony then kicks her off it. Ni Chang tries to strangle Lu Yan with her hair to climb back up to the balcony, but Lu Yan cuts her hair and causes her to fall to her death. The Monk is mortally wounded by the Warlord and passes the staff to Jason, who uses it to smash the King's statue. The King is freed and the Silent Monk is revealed to be one of the King's clones. Sparrow is killed, the Warlord is eventually stabbed by Jason after being defeated by the Monkey King and falls into a lava pit to his death. The Jade Emperor, having returned from his meditation, praises Jason for fulfilling the prophecy and grants him one wish. Tripitikas asks to be returned back home.

Jason finds himself back in the present. He overpowers Lupo and drives the other hooligans away. Hop survives being shot and claims that he is immortal (indicating that he is actually Lu). Before the film ends, Jason is delighted to meet a woman who resembles Sparrow. Jason then continues honing his kung fu skills, while Lu narrates the King's search for truth.

Cast
 Jackie Chan as Lu Yan the immortal
 Michael Angarano as Jason Tripitikas
 Jet Li as Sun Wukong / Silent Monk
 Liu Yifei as Golden Sparrow / Chinatown Girl
 Collin Chou as Erlang Shen / Jade Warlord
 Li Bingbing as Ni Ni Chang
 Wang Deshun as Jade Emperor
 Morgan Benoit as Lupo

Production details

Pre-production

While the character Sun Wukong came from Wu Cheng'en's famous classical novel Journey to the West, in an interview with Screen Power magazine, actor Collin Chou denied that the plotline would be related to the novel. The details of the plot were devised by screenwriter John Fusco along with actor Jet Li. Li explains,

In a behind the scenes article he wrote for Kung Fu Magazine, screenwriter John Fusco also stated he derived the surname for the Jason Tripitikas character from "the wandering monk, Tripitaka, from Journey to the West".

The Golden Sparrow character was inspired by Cheng Pei-pei's character Golden Swallow from the  Shaw Brothers film Come Drink with Me. Before trying to kill the Jade Warlord, Golden Sparrow refers to the 1966 film, telling him to "Come drink with" her.

Production
Production began in early 1 May 2007 in the area around the Gobi Desert in Mongolia. Before filming began, the entire cast did a costume fitting and a script read through, certain dialogues were altered to suit the different actors' English speaking abilities; this was due to the majority of the cast having English as their second language. Chan described the first day of shooting as "very relaxing" because the shots only required drama and walking, with no action. When the two martial arts veterans (Chan and Li) did film action scenes together for the first time, they both expressed how easy it was to work with one another. Chan explained:

Filming finished on August 24, 2007, and the film went into post-production on September 29, 2007.

Soundtrack

Critical reception
The review aggregator website Rotten Tomatoes reports that 63% of 131 surveyed critics gave the film positive reviews; the average rating is 6/10. The consensus reads: "This hotly-anticipated pairing of martial arts legends Jackie Chan and Jet Li features dazzling fight scenes but is weighed down by too much filler." Metacritic reports the film has an average score of 57 out of 100 based on 26 reviews, indicating mixed or average reviews.

Perry Lam wrote in Muse magazine, "As a Hollywood blockbuster, The Forbidden Kingdom offers no apologies for its American-Centrism. In fact, it wears it with pride like a badge of honor".

The film was nominated for Best International Film at the Saturn Awards but lost to Let the Right One In.

Home media
The Forbidden Kingdom was released on DVD and Blu-ray 9 September 2008. It sold about 1,199,593 units which translated to revenue of $22,921,609, bringing its worldwide total to $151,758,670.

It is sold on single disc and two-disc special editions. The single disc edition has no extras but contains widescreen and full screen presentations of the film. The special edition includes a commentary by director Rob Minkoff, deleted scenes with commentary, featurettes (The Kung Fu Dream Team, Dangerous Beauty, Discovering China, Filming in Chinawood, and Monkey King and the Eight Immortals), a "Previsualization Featurette" with commentary by writer Fusco and director Minkoff, and a blooper reel. In addition to these extras, the Blu-ray release contains a digital copy.

Box office performance
The Forbidden Kingdom grossed a total of $127,906,624 worldwide — $52,075,270 in the United States and $75,831,354
in other territories. In its opening weekend in the United States and Canada, the film grossed $21,401,121 in 3,151 theaters, ranking No. 1 at the box office opening weekend and averaging $6,792 per theater.

See also
Jackie Chan filmography
Jet Li filmography
List of American films of 2008
List of martial arts films
Jianghu

References

External links

 
 
 
 
 
 Official Kung Fu Magazine "Behind the scenes" article by Gene Ching

2008 films
2008 action films
American fantasy action films
American multilingual films
American martial arts films
2000s Cantonese-language films
Chinese action films
Chinese multilingual films
Chinese martial arts films
2000s English-language films
Films directed by Rob Minkoff
Films set in Boston
Films set in China
Hong Kong action films
Hong Kong martial arts films
Hong Kong multilingual films
Hong Kong buddy films
Kung fu films
2000s Mandarin-language films
Martial arts fantasy films
Relativity Media films
Films about time travel
Films based on Journey to the West
Wuxia films
Chinese fantasy adventure films
Lionsgate films
American fantasy adventure films
Films with screenplays by John Fusco
2008 martial arts films
2000s fantasy adventure films
Films scored by David Buckley
2000s American films
2000s Hong Kong films
2008 multilingual films